These 107 species are members of Ptinus, a genus of spider beetles in the family Ptinidae.

Ptinus species

 Ptinus affinis Desbrochers des Loges, 1871 g
 Ptinus agnatus Fall, 1905 i c g
 Ptinus alternatus Fall, 1905 i c g
 Ptinus antennatus Pic, 1896 g
 Ptinus argolisanus (Reitter, 1884) g
 Ptinus arragonicus (Brenske & Reitter, 1884) g
 Ptinus atricapillus Kiesenwetter, 1877 g
 Ptinus aubei Boieldieu, 1854 g
 Ptinus auberti Abeille de Perrin, 1869 g
 Ptinus barberi Fisher, 1919 i c g
 Ptinus barrosi Pic, 1905 g
 Ptinus bertranpetiti
 Ptinus bicinctus Sturm, 1837 i c g
 Ptinus bidens Olivier, 1790 g
 Ptinus biformis Reitter, 1880 g
 Ptinus bimaculatus Melsheimer, 1845 i c g b
 Ptinus brevivittis Reitter, 1881 g
 Ptinus caelebs Fall, 1905 i c g b
 Ptinus calcaratus Kiesenwetter, 1877 g
 Ptinus calcarifer (Reitter, 1888) g
 Ptinus californicus Pic, 1900 i c g b
 Ptinus capellae Reitter, 1880 g
 Ptinus catalonicus Bellés, 2002 g
 Ptinus clavipes Panzer, 1792 i c g
 Ptinus coarcticollis Sturm, 1837 g
 Ptinus cognatus Fall, 1905 i c g
 Ptinus concurrens Fall, 1905 i c g b
 Ptinus constrictus Blatchley, 1922 i c g
 Ptinus corsicus Kiesenwetter, 1877 g
 Ptinus crassicornis Kiesenwetter, 1877 g
 Ptinus cumaniensis Pic, 1896 g
 Ptinus dubius Sturm, 1837 g
 Ptinus dufaui Pic, 1906 g
 Ptinus ellipticus (Reitter, 1894) g
 Ptinus eximius Fall, 1905 i c g
 Ptinus explanatus Fauvel, 1891 g
 Ptinus exulans Erichson, 1842 g
 Ptinus fallax Fall, 1905 i c g b
 Ptinus falli Pic, 1904 i c g b
 Ptinus feminalis Fall, 1905 i c g
 Ptinus femoralis (Reitter, 1884) g
 Ptinus fur (Linnaeus, 1758) i c g b  (whitemarked spider beetle)
 Ptinus gandolphei Pic, 1904 i c g b
 Ptinus gylippus Reitter, 1906 g
 Ptinus hirticornis Kiesenwetter, 1867 g
 Ptinus hispaniolaensis
 Ptinus hystrix Fall, 1905 i c g b
 Ptinus insularis Boheman, 1858 g
 Ptinus interruptus LeConte, 1857 i c g b
 Ptinus italicus Aragona, 1830 g
 Ptinus ivanensis (Reitter, 1902) g
 Ptinus japonicus
 Ptinus kiesenwetteri (Reitter, 1884) g
 Ptinus kruperi Pic, 1929 g
 Ptinus kutzschenbachi Reitter, 1878 g
 Ptinus latro Fabricius, 1775 i c g b  (brown spider beetle)
 Ptinus leprieuri Pic, 1896 g
 Ptinus lichenum Marsham, 1802 g
 Ptinus longivestis Fall, 1905 i c g
 Ptinus maculosus Abeille de Perrin, 1895 g
 Ptinus madoni Pic, 1932 g
 Ptinus mediterraneus
 Ptinus mitchelli Fisher, 1919 i c g
 Ptinus nigripennis Comolli, 1837 g
 Ptinus nikitanus (Brenske & Reitter, 1884) g
 Ptinus obesus P.H.Lucas, 1846 g
 Ptinus oertzeni (Reitter, 1888) g
 Ptinus palliatus (Perris, 1847) g
 Ptinus paulonotatus Pic, 1904 i c g b
 Ptinus pellitus Desbrochers des Loges, 1875 g
 Ptinus perplexus Mulsant & Rey, 1868 g
 Ptinus perrini (Reitter, 1884) g
 Ptinus phlomidis Boieldieu, 1854 g
 Ptinus pilosus Müller, 1821 g
 Ptinus podolicus Iablokoff-Khnzorian & Karapetian, 1991 g
 Ptinus prolixus Fall, 1905 i c g
 Ptinus pusillus Sturm, 1837 g
 Ptinus pyrenaeus Pic, 1897 g
 Ptinus quadrimaculatus Melsheimer, 1846 i c g
 Ptinus raptor Sturm, 1837 i c g b  (eastern spider beetle)
 Ptinus reitteri Pic, 1894 g
 Ptinus rufipes Olivier, 1790 g
 Ptinus rufolimbatus Pic, 1908 g
 Ptinus rufus Brulle, 1832 g
 Ptinus rugosicollis (Desbrochers des Loges, 1875) g
 Ptinus salvatori Pic, 1901 g
 Ptinus schatzmayeri Pic, 1934 g
 Ptinus schlerethi (Reitter, 1884) g
 Ptinus sexpunctatus Panzer, 1795 g b
 Ptinus spissicornis Abeille de Perrin, 1894 g
 Ptinus spitzyi A.Villa & G.B.Villa, 1838 g
 Ptinus strangulatus Fall, 1905 i c g b
 Ptinus subaeneus (Reitter, 1884) g
 Ptinus subpillosus Sturm, 1837 g
 Ptinus subroseus Reitter, 1888 g
 Ptinus tarsalis (Reitter, 1884) g
 Ptinus tauricus (Brenske & Reitter, 1884) g
 Ptinus tectus Boieldieu, 1856 i c g b  (Australian spider beetle)
 Ptinus texanus Pic, 1903 i c g b
 Ptinus timidus Brisout de Barneville, 1866 g
 Ptinus torretassoi Pic, 1934 g
 Ptinus tuberculatus Blatchley, 1920 i c g
 Ptinus tumidus Fall, 1905 i c g b
 Ptinus variegatus Rossi, 1794 i c g
 Ptinus vegrandis Fall, 1905 i c g
 Ptinus verticalis LeConte, 1859 i c g b
 Ptinus villiger (Reitter, 1884) i c g b  (hairy spider beetle)

Data sources: i = ITIS, c = Catalogue of Life, g = GBIF, b = Bugguide.net

References

Ptinus